The Devil's Tower was an ancient watchtower in the British Overseas Territory of Gibraltar close to a rock shelter where fossil remains of a Neanderthal child were discovered, together with palaeolithic tools. The Tower and remains, however, were unrelated.

Construction

The tower was constructed in limestone.

Devil's Tower skull
The Devil's Tower skull was that of a Neanderthal child. The remains were excavated by Dorothy Garrod in a Mousterian shelter on the site.  There is evidence of an injury to the mouth, and the teeth show developmental disorders consistent with seasonal starvation.  The classic Neanderthal large brain case is evident and the brow ridges have started to develop. The skull substantially reinforced the evidence of the Neanderthals of Gibraltar.

Most of the lower jaw has survived, along with the frontal bone, most of the right side of the face and the left parietal bone.

Eponymy
The tower gave its name to the Devil's Tower Camp, the Devils Tower Emplacement, Devil's Tower Road and other nearby places.

References

External links
 
 Reconstruction of the Neanderthal child's head and face

1940 disestablishments in Gibraltar
Buildings and structures demolished in 1940
Fortifications in Gibraltar
Archaeological sites in Gibraltar
Demolished buildings and structures in Gibraltar
Neanderthal sites
Mousterian
Watchtowers
Limestone buildings